Matt Bianco was the second album by the British band Matt Bianco, released in 1986 for WEA. For this album, the band's line-up comprised vocalist Mark Reilly and musician Mark Fisher.  Jenni Evans sings backing vocals on nearly every track (and lead vocal on two cuts), but was not listed as an official band member.

Album background and chart history

Jenni Evans and Mark Fisher were brought in after the departure of Polish singer Basia Trzetrzelewska and keyboard player Danny White, who left the original trio to establish the singer's solo career under the name of Basia.

Evans would leave Matt Bianco shortly after this album, but Fisher would become a long-term member of the group. Fisher, a keyboardist, composer, and studio wizard, contributed a more contemporary sound compared to the band's earlier work. The use of synthesizers increased notably: Yamaha's DX-7 can be heard providing the slap bass in most songs, but the choice of noted studio musicians remained consistent for this album, with Ronnie Ross being the most prominent example.

In terms of its chart position in the United Kingdom, this album was more successful than the group's debut release, reaching No. 26. It also provided three chart singles, although the only one to make the top 50 was "Yeh Yeh". This was issued as a single in September 1985, about six months prior to the album. A cover version of a song which had been a UK Number One for Georgie Fame and the Blue Flames in 1965, Matt Bianco's version of "Yeh Yeh" reached No. 13 and stayed in the British charts for 10 weeks.

The other two singles from this album, "Just Can't Stand It" and "Dancing in the Street", were both released in 1986, and only charted for 2 and 3 weeks, at No. 66 and No. 64 respectively.

After completing this album, Matt Bianco took a 13-piece band on a European tour that saw them perform in front of an audience of more than 250,000 attendees in total.

Track listing 
The CD and LP versions of this album feature a minor difference: "Yeh Yeh" appears in its 12" Dance Mix on the CD and on some LP editions, while the 7" version only appears on some vinyl records. Meanwhile, both the 7" and 12" versions are featured on some (but not all) cassette editions of the album.

 "Yeh Yeh" (Single Version) – 3:17 (on some long playing editions only)"Yeh Yeh" (12" Dance Mix) – 5:23 (on CD edition and on some Long Playing editions)
 "Dancing in the Street" – 3:56
 "Undercover" – 4:32
 "Fly by Night" – 3:50
 "Smooth" – 4:37
 "I Wonder" – 3:55
 "Just Can't Stand It" – 3:54
 "Summer Song" – 5:34
 "Sweetest Love Affair" – 3:43
 "Up Front" – 5:31

Charts

Weekly charts

Year-end charts

Credits 
Matt Bianco:
Mark Reilly: lead male vocals; background vocals on track No. 4
Mark Fisher: keyboards, mirage bass, slap bass, DX-7 slap bass, DX-7 guitar, melodica, brass arrangement

with:
Jenni Evans: lead female vocals on tracks No. 4, and #10; background vocals on tracks No. 1, #2, No. 3, #6, No. 7, #8, and No. 9
Jordan Bailey: background vocals on tracks No. 1, and No. 2
Shirley Lewis, Helena Springs: background vocals on track No. 5
Trevor Murrel: drums on tracks No. 3, #6, and No. 9
Robin Jones: percussion on tracks No. 1, #2, No. 3, #4, No. 8, and No. 10
Steve Sidwell: trumpet on track #1; trumpet solo on tracks No. 3, and No. 7
Ronnie Ross: alto sax on tracks No. 3, #8, and #10; baritone sax on tracks No. 1, #3, No. 4, #5, and No. 9
Bill Eldridge: trumpet on track No. 2
Stuart Brooks: trumpet on track #2
Martin Dobson: tenor sax on track No. 2
Dave Bishop: tenor sax on track No. 2
Tony Fisher: trumpet on tracks No. 3, and #9; flugelhorn on tracks No. 2, and No. 4
Derek Watkins: trumpet on tracks No. 3, and #9; flugelhorn on track No. 3
Bert Ezard: trumpet and flugelhorn on track No. 3
Cliff Hardie: trombone on tracks No. 3, and No. 9
Stan Sulzmann: tenor sax on tracks No. 3, and No. 9
Jim Sullivan: acoustic guitar on track No. 4
Jamie Talbot: alto sax on track No. 6
John Barclay: trumpet on track No. 9

Production and engineering
Phil Harding: production for PWL, and sound engineering
Produced by Reilly, Fisher, Harding (except No. 1 and No. 5, produced by Reilly, Harding)   
Duffy & Jamie: assistants @ P.W.L. Studios
Stuart: assistant @ Workhouse
Gerry & Stuart: assistants @ Marquee
Tim Young: mastering and digital mixing @ CBS Studios

Other staff
Haydn Cottam: sleeve painting
Graham Smith: sleeve design and sleeve photography
Sheila Rock: sleeve photography
Carl Leighton-Pope for Bonaire Group: management

Certifications

References

Paul Gambaccini, Tim Rice, Jonathan Rice, Guinness Book of British Hit Singles (9th edition) –

External links
Amazon.com: product info and reviews

1986 albums
Matt Bianco albums